The Grand National Alliance was a secular electoral alliance contesting in the 1979 Iranian Constitutional Convention election. The candidates listed by this coalition mostly included communists and nationalists.

Parties in coalition 
The groups named in the coalition's declaration of existence, were: 
 Revolutionary Organization (sāzmān-e enqelābī) and its youth wing the Revolutionary Youth Organization (sāzmān-e javānān-e enqelābī), a Maoist group split from the Tudeh Party of Iran which was later merged into the Laborers' Party of Iran
 Iranian Women's Society (jamʿiyat-e zanān-e Īrān)
 Justice Society (jamʿiyat-e edālat)
 Confederation of Iranian Students (konfederāsīūn-e jahānī-e moḥaṣṣelīn wa dānešjūyān-e īrānī)
 The Flag of Sattar Khan (səttar xan bayrağı), an Azeri-language publication which later became aligned with the Laborers' Party of Iran
 United Campaign for Establishment of the Working Class Party (etteḥād-e mobāraza dar rāh-e ījād-e hezb-e ṭabaqa-ye kārgar), later merged into the Laborers' Party of Iran

Candidates
The candidates endorsed by the coalition for Tehran Province, were:

Of the ten candidates, only two won the election who were also listed by the Coalition of Islamic Parties. Four belonged to the coalition partners, who were all defeated. They included communists Ali Sadeghi, Majid Zarbakhsh, Farideh Garman and Hadi Soudbakhsh.

Farideh Garman was an architect who had just returned to Iran after settling for 14 years in Italy.

Majid Zarbakhsh (born 1940 in Abadan, Iran) was a former student leader who had arrived in the West Germany to study and was involved in ani-Shah protests with German students associated with the New Left. In August 1969, as a secretary of the Confederation of Iranian Students (CISNU) he went to Jordan and participated in the congress of the General Union of Palestinian Students, before visiting Ruhollah Khomeini in Najaf to ensure him that CISNU was both anti-imperialist and anti-Zionist. He also agreed to consider publishing more onn Islamic aspects of opposition to Shah in that meeting. He was, along with Bahman Nirumand and Mehdi Khanbaba-Tehran, part of the triumvirate of the 'Cadres of the Revolutionary Organization', an organization split from the 'Revolutionary Organization of the Tudeh Party' which was itself an offshoot of the Tudeh Party of Iran.

The provincial candidates who were supported at least by one of the coalition partners were:

See also

 Coalition of Islamic Parties
 Quintuple Coalition
 Septuple Coalition

References

1979 establishments in Iran
Aftermath of the Iranian Revolution
Defunct left-wing political party alliances
Defunct political party alliances in Iran
Organizations established in 1979
Organizations with year of disestablishment missing